Yoichi Dam  is a rockfill dam located in Hokkaido Prefecture in Japan. The dam is used for irrigation. The catchment area of the dam is 9.6 km2. The dam impounds about 8  ha of land when full and can store 800 thousand cubic meters of water. The construction of the dam was started on 1971 and completed in 1987.

References

Dams in Hokkaido